The Health Secretary of Pakistan is the Federal Secretary for the Ministry of National Health Services, Regulation and Coordination. The position holder is a BPS-22 grade officer, usually belonging to the Pakistan Administrative Service. The current Health Secretary is Dr. M. Fakhr-e-Alam.

See also
Government of Pakistan
Federal Secretary
Education Secretary of Pakistan
Cabinet Secretary of Pakistan
Finance Secretary of Pakistan
Petroleum Secretary of Pakistan

References

Federal government ministries of Pakistan